State Trunk Highway 55 (often called Highway 55, STH-55, or WIS 55) is a state highway in Wisconsin, United States.

Route description
Along its route, STH-55 serves Kaukauna, Shawano, the Menominee Indian Reservation, Crandon, and the Nicolet side of the Chequamegon-Nicolet National Forest.

History
A new roundabout was opened at the intersection of WIS 55 and US 10 between Sherwood and Kaukauna in the autumn of 2009.

Over the summer of 2018, a  section of the Wisconsin Highway 55 at its interchange with I-41 in Kaukauna was reconstructed and 4 new roundabouts were be added.

Major intersections

See also

References

External links

055
Transportation in Calumet County, Wisconsin
Transportation in Outagamie County, Wisconsin
Transportation in Shawano County, Wisconsin
Transportation in Menominee County, Wisconsin
Transportation in Langlade County, Wisconsin
Transportation in Forest County, Wisconsin